Serratophyga is a genus of moths in the family Geometridae erected by Jeremy Daniel Holloway in 1993.

Species
Serratophyga subangulata (Warren) north-eastern Himalayas
Serratophyga xanthospilaria (Wehrli) southern China
Serratophyga sterrhoticha (Prout, 1937) Bali, Borneo, Sulawesi

References

Geometridae